The International Severe Acute Respiratory and emerging Infection Consortium (ISARIC) is an international research initiative based in Oxford, England. It is hosted at the Nuffield Department of Medicine within the University of Oxford and led by the Epidemic diseases Research Group Oxford (ERGO). ISARIC is funded by the Bill & Melinda Gates Foundation, Foreign, Commonwealth and Development Office, and Wellcome Trust.

History 
ISARIC was founded in 2011. In 2012, ISARIC joined with the World Health Organization to launch the Clinical Characterisation Protocol (CCP) program. Its founders cited the 2002–2004 SARS outbreak, 2009 swine flu outbreak and later 2012 MERS outbreak as inciting incidents for the creation of an open source platform for sharing clinical research on emerging infectious diseases. In 2019, ISARIC launched a Career Development Professional Scheme funded by the Bill & Melinda Gates Foundation.

COVID-19 
ISARIC participated in launching standardized data collection programs worldwide in response to the COVID-19 pandemic, including its COVID-19 Clinical Characterisation Protocol (CCP) in January 2020. The first COVID-19 patient record was uploaded to the CCP database on February 13, 2020, growing to over 10,000 reports within a month. Through its CCP collaboration with the World Health Organization, ISARIC has analyzed patient data in the United Kingdom to understand the clinical presentation and outcomes of COVID-19 patients.

Activities

Comprehensive Clinical Characterisation Collaboration 
ISARIC leads the Comprehensive Clinical Characterisation Collaboration (ISARIC4C), a United Kingdom-wide collaborative study funded by UK Research and Innovation and the National Institute for Health Research.

Organization

Members 
ISARIC's membership includes:

References

External links 
 Official website

Research organisations in the United Kingdom
COVID-19 researchers